Una jaula no tiene secretos (A Cage Has No Secrets) is a 1962 Spanish-Argentine comedy film directed by Agustín Navarro.
The script was written by Raúl Gurruchaga
The movie premiered on October 3, 1962.
The movie won the original screenplay award of the year.

The plot revolves around the breakdown of a building's elevator, trapping its passengers.
The breakdown occurs just before midnight on the last day of the year.
The elevator operator is Alberto Olmedo, who still had some hair at the time.
The light comedy includes various gags and humorous situations.
The film was one of the last in which Carlos Gandolfo appeared as an actor. After being diagnosed with throat cancer, he turned to directing and teaching.

Cast
Martín Andrade
Cacho Espíndola
Gloria Ferrandiz
Carlos Gandolfo
Tacholas
Juan Carlos Lamas
Alejandro Maximino
Pablo Moret
Alberto Olmedo
Rodolfo Onetto
Carlos Pamplona
Nathán Pinzón
Javier Portales
Luis Rodrigo
Edmundo Sanders

References

External links

1962 films
1960s Spanish-language films
Argentine black-and-white films
Spanish black-and-white films
1962 comedy films
Films directed by Agustín Navarro
1960s Argentine films
1960s Spanish films